The Institute for Advanced Technology in the Humanities (IATH)  is a research unit of the University of Virginia, USA. Its goal is to explore and develop information technology as a tool for scholarly humanities research. To that end, IATH provide Fellows with consulting, technical support, applications development, and networked publishing facilities. It cultivates partnerships and participate in humanities computing initiatives with libraries, publishers, information technology companies, scholarly organizations, and other groups residing at the intersection of computers and cultural heritage.

The research projects, essays, and documentation are the products of a collaboration between humanities and computer science research faculty, computer professionals, student assistants and project managers, and library faculty and staff. In many cases, this work is supported by private or federal funding agencies. In all cases, it is supported by the Fellows’ home departments; the College or School to which those departments belong; the University of Virginia Library; the Vice President for Research and Public Service; the Vice President and Chief Information Officer; the Provost; and the President of the University of Virginia.

History
The Institute for Advanced Technology in the Humanities was established at the University of Virginia in 1992, with a major grant from IBM and a multi-year commitment of support from the University.

IATH's founders are in humanities computing, digital scholarship, and academic administration. Beginning in 1992 a steering committee of scholars, including Edward Ayers, Alan Batson, Jerome McGann, Kendon Stubbs and William Wulf managed IATH. A search committee commissioned by the steering committee carried out the search for a director of the institute. John Unsworth was selected, and his term began September 1, 1993.

IATH has generated over $10.7 million in grant funding and gifts in kind since it began operations.  Much of this funding has come from Federal agencies and private foundations, and has gone to support faculty research and teaching across the University.

See also
Digital History
Digital Humanities
SNAC (Social Networks and Archival Context)

References

External links
Institute for Advanced Technology in the Humanities, website
"John Brown and the Valley of the Shadow", collection of documents and illustrations hosted by IATH

University of Virginia
Humanities education
Research institutes in Virginia
Digital Humanities Centers
1992 establishments in Virginia